Albin Harrell "Rip" Collins (September 27, 1927 – April 9, 2006) was a professional American football halfback and a punter in the All-America Football Conference (AAFC) and the National Football League (NFL). He played for the Chicago Hornets (AAFC) (1949), Baltimore Colts (NFL) (1950), and the Green Bay Packers (NFL) (1951).  Collins played college football for Louisiana State University and was drafted by the New York Bulldogs in the 6th round of the 1949 NFL Draft.

References

1927 births
2006 deaths
Players of American football from Baton Rouge, Louisiana
American football halfbacks
American football punters
LSU Tigers football players
Chicago Hornets players
Baltimore Colts (1947–1950) players
Green Bay Packers players